William Robinson (17 July 1879 – 16 September 1960) was an Australian politician.

He was born in Lefroy, Tasmania. In 1942 he was elected to the Tasmanian Legislative Council as one of the independent members for Launceston. In 1946 the two-member seat was split and Robinson became the member for Cornwall. He held the seat until his defeat in 1948. Robinson died in Latrobe in 1960.

References

1879 births
1960 deaths
Independent members of the Parliament of Tasmania
Members of the Tasmanian Legislative Council
20th-century Australian politicians